Ryan Curran (born 13 October 1993) is a footballer from Northern Ireland who plays for Cliftonville in the NIFL Premiership.

Club career

Early career
Curran began his senior career at Derry City, making eleven appearances before being sent out on loan to Finn Harps in August 2012. He only made two appearances for Harps before returning to Derry City in the same month.

Return to Derry City
After returning from a loan spell at Finn Harps, Curran made 72 appearances for Derry City, netting five goals. He was part of the squad that won the 2012 FAI Cup, before returning to Finn Harps in 2015.<ref name = "Finn Harps sign former Derry City striker Ryan Curran"

Finn Harps
Curran signed for then newly promoted League Of Ireland side Finn Harps in 2015. On 10 May 2016, Curran scored in a 2–2 draw against his former club, Derry City. Harps finished 10th in the table, and Curran left for then NIFL Premiership outfit Ballinamallard United in January 2017.

Ballinamallard United
In his first season at Ballinamallard, Curran made 10 appearances, scoring twice. He suffered a persistent ankle injury problem throughout his early career and it affected him at the beginning of his time at Ballinamallard. In March 2017, He played his first full 90 minutes for Ballinamallard in a match against Ards. Curran scored 16 goals for Ballinamallard in the 2017/18 season before they were relegated on the final day. He left Ballinamallard for Cliftonville in May 2018.

Cliftonville
Cliftonville announced the signing of Ryan Curran on 4 May 2018. He made his debut in a Europa League qualifier against Danish Superliga side FC Nordsjaelland in July 2018. In Curran’s first season with the Reds, he won the Cliftonville Players’ Player of the Year and the Cliftonville Player of the Year. In January 2020, Curran scored a last-minute winner in a dramatic County Antrim Shield final comeback against Ballymena, winning his first trophy with the club. On 13 March 2022, Ryan Curren put in a Man Of The Match display during which Cliftonville won its sixth Irish League Cup against Coleraine at  Windsor Park.

Honours
Derry City
FAI Cup: 2012
Cliftonville
County Antrim Shield: 2019-20
Irish League Cup: 2021–22

References

1993 births
Living people
Sportspeople from Derry (city)
Association footballers from Northern Ireland
Association football forwards
Derry City F.C. players
Finn Harps F.C. players
Ballinamallard United F.C. players
Cliftonville F.C. players
League of Ireland players
NIFL Premiership players